Springtime with Roo (also known as Winnie the Pooh: Springtime with Roo) is a 2004 American direct-to-video animated musical comedy film produced by Walt Disney Pictures and DisneyToon Studios, and animated by Toon City Animation in Manila, Philippines. The film features characters from Disney's Winnie the Pooh franchise, based on the original characters from the A. A. Milne treasured books. The story is loosely based on Charles Dickens' classic 1843 novella A Christmas Carol. Unlike the previous Winnie the Pooh direct-to-video films A Very Merry Pooh Year and Seasons of Giving, Springtime with Roo does not reuse any episodes from The New Adventures of Winnie the Pooh.

Plot
Springtime has sprung in the Hundred Acre Wood and Roo, Tigger, Pooh, Piglet and Eeyore head to Rabbit's house to celebrate Easter, only to find that Rabbit has organized a "Spring Cleaning" Day instead. He orders the gang to clean his house while he tidies up his garden. Initially dejected, the gang, not wanting to let Rabbit down, proceed to carry out Rabbit's orders. While dusting, Pooh sneezes violently, cluttering the house. A large trunk falls out of Rabbit's closet, revealing Easter eggs, decorations, and his Easter Bunny top hat. They also find their favorite Easter things: Pooh's honey pot, Piglet's Easter basket, Eeyore's rabbit ears, and Tigger's striped Easter egg. Assuming that Rabbit had forgotten about Easter, the gang decide to surprise Rabbit by decorating the house, only for this to backfire as an enraged Rabbit literally throws them out of his house for not obeying his orders, trampling his hat in the process.

While Pooh, Piglet, and Eeyore return home, Roo wanders off. Tigger finds him and Roo asks if they will ever celebrate Easter again, prompting Tigger to go back to Rabbit's house to talk to him. Hopeful that Tigger will be able to convince Rabbit and determined to cheer his friends up, Roo returns home and tells his mother, Kanga, what happened, before venturing off to find the others. While they wait for Tigger to return, they practice hunting for Easter eggs by hunting for rocks.

Meanwhile, Tigger returns to Rabbit's house and tells Rabbit about how upset Roo was that they did not have an Easter egg hunt. Rabbit, however, is still far too angry that the gang messed up his Spring Cleaning Day to care and tells Tigger he'll never allow another Easter celebration ever again. Tigger and the narrator tell Rabbit that he used to love Easter but Rabbit denies it. To prove it, Tigger takes him back through the book to last year's Easter celebration, when Kanga and Roo moved to the Hundred Acre Wood.

In the flashback, the gang prepares for Easter, painting eggs and making decorations. As it is Roo's first Easter in the Hundred Acre Wood, Rabbit wants everything to be as organized and orderly as possible to the point that he treats Easter as a professional occasion rather than a fun holiday. The others grow tired of Rabbit's bossiness and, under Tigger's suggestion, sneak off with the Easter eggs. Rabbit goes after them and finds them having the egg hunt without him, with the gang agreeing that Tigger is "the best Easter Bunny ever," upsetting Rabbit.

Outside the book, Rabbit admits to Tigger that he did once look forward to being the Easter Bunny, but his exclusion the previous year made him feel unwanted. Tigger says it was not his or the others' intention to leave him out, but Rabbit, still upset about the past, continues to deny Easter in the Hundred Acre Wood. Tigger returns to the present and tells the others the bad news, while also explaining the reason for Rabbit's hot-temper. This causes everyone to feel remorseful for unwillingly taking away Rabbit's favorite Easter role. Rabbit also returns to the present, but the narrator purposely stops on the wrong page, at Roo's house, where Rabbit sees Roo wishing that he could make things up to Rabbit. Still unconvinced, Rabbit returns home and puts all the Easter things in the trunk before going to sleep.

Frustrated with Rabbit's stubborn behavior, the narrator (after scaring Rabbit awake with a ghost-like voice) transports Rabbit forward in time to the "unwritten pages of the book" – the future of the Hundred Acre Wood where it is Spring Cleaning Day and everything is organized exactly as Rabbit wants. Initially delighted, Rabbit asks where his friends are, thinking that they are late, but the narrator says they all moved away because of his selfishness and bossiness. Refusing to believe this, Rabbit tries to find them but realizes that the narrator wasn't kidding when he discovers that his friends' homes are empty and abandoned; the narrator claims the reason why was because Rabbit didn't treat them like friends and only cared about himself, which Rabbit at first denies. Finally realizing how his bad behavior affected his friends and not wanting to be alone for the rest of his life, Rabbit runs back to his house intent on having Easter in order to atone for his mistakes, only to find out to his horror that his friends' things have gone with them.

Rabbit then wakes up the next morning and finds himself back in the present, overjoyed to see the Easter supplies are still there and that he still has a chance to change the future. Now "giddy as a jackrabbit", Rabbit immediately begins to plan the grandest Easter the Hundred Acre Wood has ever had. At the same time, Roo, unaware that Rabbit has changed, comes up with an idea in hopes of cheering Rabbit up. He picks up Pooh, Piglet, Eeyore, and Tigger with a wheelbarrow, but loses control of it and crashes into his house. While they are busy working, Rabbit arrives, pretending to still be angry, but their fears fade when he surprises them with their Easter decorations, along with a cotton tail for Eeyore. Rabbit shows them the celebration he has prepared and reveals his change of heart, which everyone is very happy to see, especially Roo, who returns Rabbit his now-repaired Easter Bunny hat, giving Rabbit back his favorite Easter role. The spirit of Easter is now restored, and Roo pops out of the book and says, "B.B.F.N., Bye-bye for now!", ending the film.

Voice cast
 Jimmy Bennett as Roo
 Ken Sansom as Rabbit
 Jim Cummings as Winnie the Pooh and Tigger
 David Ogden Stiers as The Narrator
 Kath Soucie as Kanga
 John Fiedler as Piglet
 Jeff Bennett as Piglet's singing voice
 Peter Cullen as Eeyore

Production
The film was produced by Disneytoon Studios, and Toon City, a start up animation company founded by former Disney Feature Animation Florida employees.

Home media
The film was released on DVD and VHS on March 9, 2004. It included the teaser trailer for Pooh's Heffalump Movie and the two episodes from The New Adventures of Winnie the Pooh (Honey for a Bunny and Trap as Trap Can). It was later re-released on Blu-ray combo pack on March 11, 2014, as a Hippity-Hoppity Roo edition. This marks the 10th anniversary of the film.

Songs

See also
 Adaptations of A Christmas Carol

References

External links

  
 
 

Winnie-the-Pooh films
2004 animated films
2004 films
2004 direct-to-video films
2000s adventure comedy films
2000s American animated films
2000s musical comedy films
American children's animated adventure films
American children's animated comedy films
American children's animated musical films
American films with live action and animation
Direct-to-video sequel films
Winnie the Pooh (franchise)
Disney direct-to-video animated films
DisneyToon Studios animated films
Easter Bunny in film
Films based on A Christmas Carol
Films scored by Mark Watters
Walt Disney Pictures films
2004 directorial debut films
2004 comedy films
2000s children's animated films
American musical comedy-drama films
2000s English-language films